Vítor Sérgio dos Santos Valente (born 13 March 1965), is a Portuguese retired footballer who played as a goalkeeper.

Club career
After beginning in the lower leagues, Lisbon-born Valente made his Primeira Liga debut in 1986–87 while at the service of C.S. Marítimo, appearing in 14 league games for a final 13th position. He spent three of the following four seasons also in the top division, in representation of Académica de Coimbra and C.F. União.

In 1991, about one year after the club lost Zé Beto in a car accident, FC Porto bought Valente to act as backup to future club legend Vítor Baía, and he ended up playing only two matches in his two year-spell at the Estádio das Antas, totalling 13 minutes in two substitute appearances. He met the same fate at his next team, Boavista FC.

After three seasons with C.F. Os Belenenses (top level, starting in his second year), the 32-year-old Valente signed for F.C. Alverca of the same tier, being understudy to Paulo Santos. He then returned to former side Académica, who now competed in the Segunda Liga.

Valente retired from football at the age of 39, after one year apiece with amateurs Imortal D.C. and F.C. Pampilhosa. Subsequently, he worked as a goalkeeper coach at U.D. Leiria and the Burkina Faso, Gabon national teams and CS Sfaxien, always under compatriot Paulo Duarte.

References

External links

1965 births
Living people
Footballers from Lisbon
Portuguese footballers
Association football goalkeepers
Primeira Liga players
Liga Portugal 2 players
Segunda Divisão players
Casa Pia A.C. players
Atlético Clube de Portugal players
C.S. Marítimo players
Associação Académica de Coimbra – O.A.F. players
C.F. União players
FC Porto players
Boavista F.C. players
C.F. Os Belenenses players
F.C. Alverca players
Imortal D.C. players
FC Pampilhosa players